Julien Dufau (16 February 1888 – 28 December 1916) was a rugby union player, who represented France. He died in World War I.

References

Further reading
 Sports Gazette

French rugby union players
1888 births
1916 deaths
France international rugby union players
French military personnel killed in World War I
Sportspeople from Biarritz
Stade Bordelais players
Biarritz Olympique players
Rugby union centres
Rugby union wings
Chevaliers of the Légion d'honneur